The Rans S-21 Outbound is an American STOL homebuilt aircraft that was designed by Randy Schlitter and is produced by Rans Designs of Hays, Kansas. It was introduced at AirVenture in 2016. The aircraft is supplied as a quick-build kit for amateur construction or ready-to-fly.

Design and development
The S-21 Outbound features a strut-braced high-wing, a two-seats-in-side-by-side configuration enclosed cabin accessed via doors, fixed tricycle landing gear or optionally conventional landing gear and a single engine in tractor configuration.

The aircraft is made from aluminum sheet, with both leading edge and trailing edge extruded spars. The sheet metal parts employ final-size matched holes to reduce builder errors and speed construction. The standard engine used is the  Continental Titan X-340 powerplant. Tundra tires up to  may be fitted.

The S-21 competes with the CubCrafters Carbon Cub EX and the American Legend Super Legend HP in the kit aircraft market.

The prototype, registered N215RD, first flew on 17 December 2017, it gained special light-sport aircraft approval in March 2018 with the Rotax 912 ULS, Rotax 912 iS, Lycoming YO-233 and Titan OX-340 engines.

Operational history
In a review for KitPlanes magazine writer Dave Prizio stated that aircraft amateur builders, "seem to want a high-wing utility plane they can use to knock around the backcountry. It's nice to be able to get from here to there at 180 knots, but if there ends up being a 1200-foot dirt strip, an RV-8 doesn't look like the best choice for the trip. The point is that the utility plane is the hot ticket right now, and RANS seems to have come up with just the right plane at just the right time. And if the S-21 with a 100-hp Rotax is a good plane (it is), it is a better plane with 180 hp—a much better plane. This S-21 with the big engine and big tires was a hit at Sun 'n Fun 2019. Everyone wanted a demo ride in this popular new configuration of what is proving to be a very popular plane."

Specifications (S-21 Outbound)

References

External links

Rans S-21
Single-engined tractor aircraft
High-wing aircraft
Homebuilt aircraft
Aircraft first flown in 2017